Mehdiabad (also Romanized as Mehdīābād; also known as Mihdiābād) is a village in Miyan Ab-e Shomali Rural District, in the Central District of Shushtar County, Khuzestan Province, Iran. At the 2006 census, its population was 1,736, in 378 families.

References 

Populated places in Shushtar County